Jesse Bosch (born 1 February 2000) is a Dutch professional footballer who plays as a midfielder for Eerste Divisie club Willem II.

Club career

Twente
Born in De Lutte, Bosch played as a youth player for hometown club SV De Lutte before moving to the FC Twente where he progressed through the youth system. On 26 May 2018, he made his first appearance for the reserve team, Jong FC Twente, in the Derde Divisie in a 1–3 win over ODIN '59. After this, Jong FC Twente was removed from the Dutch football league system as the first team had suffered relegation from the top-tier Eredivisie, and Bosch played for the reserve team in the Beloften Eredivisie instead. In 2019, he was officially promoted from the U19 squad to Jong FC Twente.

In the 2019–20 season he became a regular part of the first team of Twente. He made his professional debut on 30 October 2019, in a 0–2 KNVB Cup win over De Treffers. Bosch came on as a substitute for Lindon Selahi in the 63rd minute. During a training camp in the winter break, he made a strong impression on head coach Gonzalo García García, who gave him a spot in the starting lineup in the next match, at home against FC Groningen on 18 January 2020.

Willem II
On 28 July 2022, Bosch signed a two-year contract with Willem II.

References

External links
 Jesse Bosch at Voetbal International 

Living people
2000 births
People from Losser
Association football midfielders
Dutch footballers
FC Twente players
Willem II (football club) players
Eredivisie players
Footballers from Overijssel
Derde Divisie players
Jong FC Twente players